The Runaway is a 1926 American silent film melodrama directed by William C. deMille and starring Clara Bow, Warner Baxter, William Powell, and George Bancroft. The plot involves a movie star who erroneously assumes that she has murdered someone and flees to Kentucky. The cinematography was by Charles P. Boyle.

Plot

Cynthia Meade (Clara Bow), a wild, high spirited New York movie actress, meets Jack Harrison (William Powell), a wealthy young New Yorker, in a Tennessee city. She is hoping he will be able to help her with her movie career, but he demands a relationship in return. A stray bullet comes through the window and he is dangerously wounded while with Cynthia. She realizes how hard it will be to prove her innocence and flees, thinking Harrison dead.
On a lonely road. Cynthia, half hysterical and nearly exhausted, appeals to Wade Murrell (Warner Baxter), a young mountaineer on the way back to his Kentucky home. He believes that she is running away from danger and takes her with him.  Arriving at his house, he is disgusted when he learns she cannot cook or do any of the daily chores of hill women. But she finally wins the confidence of his mother (Edythe Chapman). Several weeks later, Harrison, the supposedly dead man, appears, saying he is seeking the person who shot and left him for dead. Murrell does not know at first that Cynthia is the person Harrison suspects, and the two become good friends. The presence of a “painted woman,” as the hill people call Cynthia arouses a terrific antipathy toward Murrell, and he narrowly avoids being killed by one of their number. In the end, Cynthia is forced to choose between her old and new lover, but not before the three have passed through many crises.

Cast
Clara Bow as Cynthia Meade
Warner Baxter as Wade Murrell
William Powell as Jack Harrison
George Bancroft as Lesher Skidmore
Edythe Chapman as Mrs. Murrell

Preservation status
The Runaway is believed to be lost.

References

External links

Lobby card
Lobby poster

1926 films
1926 drama films
American black-and-white films
American silent feature films
Films directed by William C. deMille
Lost American films
Paramount Pictures films
Silent American drama films
Melodrama films
1926 lost films
Lost drama films
1920s American films